Learn Way is a South Korean variety show airing weekend on KakaoTV, which premiered every Sunday at 12 noon and a re-run on 1theK Originals' YouTube channel every Friday at 12 pm KST.

The first season aired on September 20, 2020 to May 2, 2021 hosted by (G)I-dle's Song Yuqi. The second season premiered on July 11, 2021 to February 25, 2022 hosted by Lovelyz's Mijoo.

Overview
KakaoTV's original entertainment show Learn Way is a project that captures (G)I-dle's Song Yuqi process of being reborn as an 'all-rounder' by meeting with expert mentors in various fields. She is a self-proclaimed center, and visual who can dance and sing, and quickly becomes friends with anyone. In Learn Way, Yuqi will show mentors through special chemistry across ages, genres, and borders with her unique affinity. In particular, she plans to show off her cute speech and an unusually lively charm and unfolds an entertainment cheeky level. As an idol member, she will learn various fields that she has not tried, and will provide not only unpredictable laughter but also the reward of learning and growth.

Slogan
Main: 'Let's go! On the way to learning!'
Opening: 'Path of Learning, Learn Way'

Host
 Song Yuqi ((G)I-dle) (Season 1)
 Mijoo (Lovelyz) (Season 2)

Celebrity guest

Episodes

Season 1 (2020–2021)

Season 2 (2021–2022)

Spin-off

Learn Star

On January 24, 2021, it was announced that a spin-off, titled Learn Star focusing Yuqi learning from the celebrity guest. With the slogan, 'Learning from an entertainer, Learntainer'.

Reception
Learn Way'''s viewership has exceeded 1 million since episode 19. Lee Ye-ji from the South Korean newspaper Newsen, wrote that "Learnway'' is loved by many viewers due to Yuqi's passion and positive attitude ... in acknowledging her mistakes ... and the chemistry between Yuqi and mentors who have appeared from various fields. Yuqi harmonized with the mentors who had appeared so far without any sense of incongruity, and quickly became friends and created chemistry." She also considered the show as something the viewers can enjoy, learn and understand about various occupational groups every time. She concluded, "Learnway is being loved by adding various things to see, know, and fun." As the show progresses, it surpassed 2 million views each time the episode was uploaded.

The show's producer Kim Ki-min said, "Yuqi lived up to [his] expectations." He commented, "Yuqi who has passed cute charm and excellent entertainment, meets mentors full of personality in various fields ... giving fun and laughter with a new look every time.

Notes

References

External links
Learn Way Episodes on KakaoTV
Learn Way Season 2 Episodes on KakaoTV

KakaoTV original programming
2020 South Korean television series debuts
2022 South Korean television series endings
South Korean variety television shows
South Korean television talk shows
Television series based on singers and musicians
Korean-language television shows